Robert Leckie (19 October 1846 – February 1887) was a Scottish footballer and one of the founding members of Queen's Park Football Club.

Leckie played for Queen's Park from its formation in 1867 until his retirement from football in 1875, winning the inaugural Scottish Cup competition in 1874.

He also won a solitary cap for the Scotland national team, playing in the first ever international match against England on 30 November 1872.

References

External links

1846 births
1887 deaths
Scottish footballers
Scotland international footballers
Queen's Park F.C. players
Date of death missing
Association football forwards
Footballers from Stirling (council area)